Susann Kuhfittig (born 1 September 1965) is a German cross-country skier. She competed in three events at the 1988 Winter Olympics.

Cross-country skiing results
All results are sourced from the International Ski Federation (FIS).

Olympic Games

World Championships

World Cup

Season standings

Individual podiums
1 podium

References

External links
 

1965 births
Living people
People from Zella-Mehlis
People from Bezirk Suhl
German female cross-country skiers
Sportspeople from Thuringia
Olympic cross-country skiers of East Germany
Cross-country skiers at the 1988 Winter Olympics
20th-century German women